Thaumaspis is a genus of Asian bush crickets belonging to the tribe Meconematini in the subfamily Meconematinae.  The known distribution is from India, southern China, and Malesia (Java), but records are probably incomplete.

Species
The Orthoptera Species File lists the following subgenera and species:
Subgenus Isothaumaspis 
 Thaumaspis forcipatus 
Subgenus Thaumaspis 
 Thaumaspis castetsi 
 Thaumaspis henanensis 
 Thaumaspis longipes 
 Thaumaspis montanus 
 Thaumaspis siccifolii 
 Thaumaspis trigonurus  – type species (locality: Tamil Nadu, India)

The genus Pseudothaumaspis, previously placed here as a subgenus of Thaumaspis, is now considered a separate genus.  Other species transferred to other genera include Athaumaspis bifurcatus.

References

External links

Meconematinae
Tettigoniidae genera
Orthoptera of Asia